Louis Pons (born 1927) is a French collage artist. He specializes in reliefs and assemblages made entirely from discarded objects and junk. In Agnès Varda's documentary The Gleaners and I, Pons explains his artistic process and understanding of art; what others see as "a cluster of junk," he sees as "a cluster of possibilities;" and that the function of art is to tidy up one's inner and exterior worlds.

References

External links
The artwork of Louis Pons
Photo of Pons taken by Henri Cartier-Bresson
Portrait of Pons by Maria Cristina Melo

French artists
Collage artists
1927 births
Possibly living people